The Ring magazine was established in 1922 and has named a Fighter of the Year since 1928, which this list covers. The award, selected by the magazine editors, is based on a boxer's performance in the ring.

Award winners
Numbers in brackets indicate the number of times a boxer has won the award by that year.

1920s
1928: Gene Tunney
1929: Tommy Loughran

1930s

1930: Max Schmeling
1931: Tommy Loughran (2)
1932: Jack Sharkey
1933: no award given
1934: Tony Canzoneri and  Barney Ross
1935: Barney Ross (2)
1936: Joe Louis
1937: Henry Armstrong
1938: Joe Louis (2)
1939: Joe Louis (3)

1940s
1940: Billy Conn
1941: Joe Louis (4)
1942: Sugar Ray Robinson
1943: Fred Apostoli
1944: Beau Jack
1945: Willie Pep
1946: Tony Zale
1947: Gus Lesnevich
1948: Ike Williams
1949: Ezzard Charles

1950s
1950: Ezzard Charles (2)
1951: Sugar Ray Robinson (2)
1952: Rocky Marciano
1953: Bobo Olson
1954: Rocky Marciano (2)
1955: Rocky Marciano (3)
1956: Floyd Patterson
1957: Carmen Basilio
1958: Ingemar Johansson
1959: Ingemar Johansson (2)

1960s

1960: Floyd Patterson (2)
1961: Joe Brown
1962: Dick Tiger
1963: Cassius Clay (Muhammad Ali)
1964: Emile Griffith
1965: Dick Tiger (2)
1966: Muhammad Ali (2) (originally not awarded; retroactively awarded in 2016)
1967: Joe Frazier
1968: Nino Benvenuti
1969: José Nápoles

1970s
1970: Joe Frazier (2)
1971: Joe Frazier (3)
1972: Muhammad Ali (3) and Carlos Monzón
1973: George Foreman
1974: Muhammad Ali (4)
1975: Muhammad Ali (5)
1976: George Foreman (2)
1977: Carlos Zarate
1978: Muhammad Ali (6)
1979: Sugar Ray Leonard

1980s
1980: Thomas Hearns
1981: Sugar Ray Leonard (2) and Salvador Sánchez
1982: Larry Holmes
1983: Marvin Hagler
1984: Thomas Hearns (2)
1985: Marvin Hagler (2)  and   Donald Curry
1986: Mike Tyson
1987: Evander Holyfield
1988: Mike Tyson (2)
1989: Pernell Whitaker

1990s
1990: Julio César Chávez
1991: James Toney
1992: Riddick Bowe
1993: Michael Carbajal
1994: Roy Jones Jr.
1995: Oscar De La Hoya
1996: Evander Holyfield (2)
1997: Evander Holyfield (3)
1998: Floyd Mayweather Jr.
1999: Paulie Ayala

2000s
2000: Félix Trinidad
2001: Bernard Hopkins
2002: Vernon Forrest
2003: James Toney (2)
2004: Glen Johnson
2005: Ricky Hatton
2006: Manny Pacquiao
2007: Floyd Mayweather Jr. (2)
2008: Manny Pacquiao (2)
2009: Manny Pacquiao (3)

2010s
2010: Sergio Martínez
2011: Andre Ward
2012: Juan Manuel Márquez
2013: Adonis Stevenson
2014: Sergey Kovalev
2015: Tyson Fury
2016: Carl Frampton
2017: Vasiliy Lomachenko
2018: Oleksandr Usyk
2019: Canelo Álvarez

2020s
2020: Tyson Fury (2) and  Teófimo López
2021: Canelo Álvarez (2)
2022: Dmitry Bivol

Fighter of the Decade
1910s: Sam Langford
1920s: Benny Leonard
1930s: Henry Armstrong
1940s: Sugar Ray Robinson
1950s: Sugar Ray Robinson (2)
1960s: Muhammad Ali
1970s: Roberto Durán
1980s: Sugar Ray Leonard
1990s: Roy Jones Jr.
2000s: Manny Pacquiao
2010s: Floyd Mayweather Jr.

See also

Sugar Ray Robinson Award, a similar award by the Boxing Writers Association of America
Best Boxer ESPY Award and its successor, the Best Fighter ESPY Award

References

External links

1928 establishments in the United States
Awards established in 1928
Boxing awards
Most valuable player awards
Fighters of the year
Ring